= Baan Kamlangchay =

Baan Kamlangchay is a home for demented patients from German-speaking countries, located in the village of Faham near Chiang Mai, Thailand. It has been the subject of press and TV coverage in Germany and Switzerland because of its novel model.

The home was founded in 2004 and is operated by the Swiss Martin Woodtli and his Thai wife. It currently houses 10 patients in six houses. Each patients is cared for around the clock by three personal caregivers who work in 8-hour shifts. Caregivers have limited knowledge of German and communicate with physical contact, administer massages, play games with the patients, etc. The monthly fee per patient is about 2,000 Euros, roughly half of the cost of full-time care in Germany. The caregivers earn about 200 Euros per month.
